Belle ma povere (internationally released as Pretty But Poor) is a 1957 Italian comedy film directed by Dino Risi. It is the sequel of Poveri ma belli and was followed by Poveri milionari.

Plot 
Romolo and Salvatore are two Roman boys, engaged respectively to Annamaria and Marisa, Salvatore's first sister and Romulus's second. The two girls would like to get married soon, but the two engaged couples have neither a steady job nor the intention of putting their heads straight: then they unwillingly decide to follow a radio engineering course in an evening school where however Romulus is committed while Salvatore quickly abandons them. Education.

The two are great friends but they quarrel when Giovanna, an old flame of both of them, returns. She is the latter after leaving her beloved Hugh she works in the jewelry of her boyfriend Franco. Romulus thinks that Salvatore is not suitable to marry his sister, and Salvatore thinks the same of Romulus and his sister, and as long as they are both idle the marriage for both will not take place.

But Annamaria and Marisa suffer even more. Marisa, understood that Salvatore will never have a steady job, decides to go to work as a clerk in a shoe shop where she meets a charming young man who courts her. Salvatore, fearing to lose Marisa, decides to become a thief. Meanwhile Romulus, to open his radio shop, borrows money from Giovanna's boyfriend who, to make her partner jealous and lead him to the wedding, again feigns interest in Romulus, arousing Annamaria's jealousy.

Just when Romulus decides to return the money he had on loan to Giovanna, Salvatore with the help of an accomplice decides to break into Franco's jewelry and steal everything. However, he is stopped by Marisa, who explains to Salvatore that there is nothing between her and the young man. Even between Romulus and Annamaria everything is clarified. Romulus and Salvatore understand that what matters is inner wealth.

The marriages of Romulus with Annamaria and of Salvatore with Marisa are then celebrated on the same day, in the same church, that of Piazza Navona, with the same clothes. And also Giovanna finally gets married with Franco.

Cast 
 Marisa Allasio as  Giovanna
 Maurizio Arena as Romolo
 Renato Salvatori as Salvatore
 Lorella De Luca as Marisa
 Alessandra Panaro as Anna Maria
 Riccardo Garrone as Franco
 Memmo Carotenuto as Alvaro
 Gildo Bocci
 Marisa Castellani
 Carlo Giuffrè
 Nino Vingelli

References

External links
 

1957 films
Films directed by Dino Risi
Italian comedy films
Films set in Rome
Films shot in Rome
1957 comedy films
1950s Italian films